Donald Bobiash is a Canadian diplomat. He is Ambassador of Canada to Indonesia, with accreditation to Timor Leste. He was High Commissioner to Ghana then Ambassador Extraordinary and Plenipotentiary to Togo. He attended the London School of Economics on a Commonwealth Scholarship in 1983.

External links 
 Ambassador's Message
 Foreign Affairs and International Trade Canada Complete List of Posts 
 University of Saskatchewan 100 Alumni of Influence Page

Year of birth missing (living people)
Living people
Place of birth missing (living people)
High Commissioners of Canada to Ghana
Ambassadors of Canada to Togo